Hypercharge: Unboxed (stylized as HYPERCHARGE: Unboxed) is a cooperative third-person and first-person shooter video game, developed by British indie studio Digital Cybercherries, and released for Microsoft Windows and Nintendo Switch in 2020. The game takes place in familiar locations such as bedrooms, garages, bathrooms, hallways and toy stores. Each player assumes the role of an action figure, who must defend parts of their territory from dangerous enemies.

Gameplay 
Hypercharge: Unboxed is a third-person and first-person shooter with defense building mechanics set in suburban home environments. Most of the gameplay is built around exploration, combat, and character customization.

The game's combat is mainly ranged-based. Players can use attachments for different weapons, which can be found scattered throughout each level. It has a heavy focus on cooperative gameplay and the game features a four player, co-operative multiplayer mode.

While traversing each map, players find various supplies and items, such as batteries, weapons, attachments and credits. Batteries are used to power the HYPER-CORES' shield and defenses, and attachments give each weapon a perk. Credits can be used to purchase weapons, attachments and defenses.

Development
Digital Cybercherries were awarded an Unreal Dev Grant which helped to further fund Hypercharge: Unboxed. It is built in the Unreal Engine 4.

The game was released on the Nintendo eShop on January 31, 2020 and on Steam on April 27, 2020.

References

External links

 

2020 video games
Indie video games
Windows games
Nintendo Switch games
First-person shooter multiplayer online games
First-person shooters
Third-person shooters
Multiplayer online games
Cooperative video games
Multiplayer and single-player video games
Unreal Engine games
Sentient toys in fiction
Video games about toys
Video games developed in the United Kingdom